Batcheller's Cave is a small cave in Roxbury, New Hampshire, United States, said to be the hiding place of Breed Batcheller, a town founder who failed to support the rebellion of the colonies against England in the Revolutionary War.

The cave was immortalized in the poem "The Tory's Cave" by F.H. Meloon, Jr:

THE TORY'S CAVE

(The legend is of Roxbury, N.H., early founded by the Buckminsters [perhaps sic], and now practically deserted.)

By Roxbury's deserted town,
Not a full mile outside,
Where oaks in rude defiance frown,
A Tory once did hide.
The mad rebellion 'gainst the king
Was little shared by him,
And so he dwelt, a hunted thing,
Within a cavern dim.

By Roxbury's deserted town
The trav'ler still decries
A rocky cave, half tumbled down,
Before his wond'ring eyes.
'Twas there the Tory dwelt of old,
'Twas there they found him dead,
'Twas there they laid him 'neath the mould
Within his lonely bed.

By Roxbury's deserted town
The summers come and go,
The sun's successive smile or frown
Above the winter snow.
Go ask Buckminster, if you will,
Who is that ghost-like knave?
He'll bid you hold your speech until
You've trod the Tory's Cave.

References

Landforms of Cheshire County, New Hampshire
American Revolutionary War articles needing attention
Caves of New Hampshire
Caves used for hiding
Roxbury, New Hampshire